Yamunotri Legislative Assembly constituency is one of the 70 assembly constituencies of  Uttarakhand a northern state of India. Yamunotri is part of Tehri Garhwal Lok Sabha constituency.

Members of Legislative Assembly
 2002 - Pritam Singh Panwar (UKD)
 2007 - Kedar Singh Rawat (INC)
 2012 - Pritam Singh Panwar (IND)
 2017 - Kedar Singh Rawat (BJP)

Election results

2022

See also
 Uttarkashi (Uttarakhand Assembly constituency)

References

External links
 

Uttarkashi
Assembly constituencies of Uttarakhand
2002 establishments in Uttarakhand
Constituencies established in 2002